Swingin' with Pee Wee is an album by clarinetist Pee Wee Russell with trumpeter Buck Clayton which was recorded in 1960 and released on the Swingville label.

Reception

Scott Yanow of AllMusic states, "Russell and trumpeter Buck Clayton make for a perfectly compatible team on the 1960 date ... His playing is much more consistent and comfortable on the mid-tempo material than usual and he mostly gets to avoid the overly hyper Dixieland warhorses. A gem".

Track listing
 "What Can I Say Dear" (Walter Donaldson, Abe Lyman) – 5:00
 "Midnight Blue" (Pee Wee Russell) – 5:38
 "The Very Thought of You" (Ray Noble) – 4:40
 "Lulu's Back In Town" (Harry Warren, Al Dubin) – 5:02
 "Wrap Your Troubles in Dreams" (Harry Barris, Ted Koehler, Billy Moll) – 5:37
 "I Would Do Most Anything for You" (Mack David) – 6:07
 "Englewood" (Russell) – 6:40

Personnel
Pee Wee Russell – clarinet
Buck Clayton – trumpet
Tommy Flanagan – piano
Wendell Marshall – bass
Osie Johnson – drums

References

Pee Wee Russell albums
Buck Clayton albums
1960 albums
Swingville Records albums
Albums recorded at Van Gelder Studio
Albums produced by Esmond Edwards